The dusky fulvetta (Schoeniparus brunneus) is a species of bird in the family Pellorneidae. 
It is found in China and Taiwan.
Its natural habitats are temperate forest and subtropical or tropical moist lowland forest.

References

Collar, N. J. & Robson, C. 2007. Family Timaliidae (Babblers)  pp. 70 – 291 in; del Hoyo, J., Elliott, A. & Christie, D.A. eds. Handbook of the Birds of the World, Vol. 12. Picathartes to Tits and Chickadees. Lynx Edicions, Barcelona.

dusky fulvetta
Birds of South China
Birds of Hainan
Birds of Taiwan
dusky fulvetta
Taxonomy articles created by Polbot